The Speedway Grand Prix of Sweden is a speedway event that is a part of the Speedway Grand Prix Series.

Winners

Most wins
 Jason Crump  4 times

See also
List of sporting events in Sweden
Speedway Grand Prix of Scandinavia

References 

 
Grand Prix of Sweden
Sweden